A hybrid organization is an organization that mixes elements, value systems and action logics (e.g. social impact and profit generation) of various sectors of society, i.e. the public sector, the private sector and the voluntary sector. A more general notion of hybridity can be found in Hybrid institutions and governance.

According to previous research hybrids between public and private spheres consist of following features:

 Shared ownership.
 Goal incongruence and different institutional logics in the same organisation.
 Variety in the sources of financing.
 Differentiated forms of economic and social control.
Value creation in hybrids proceeds through three mechanisms 
 mixing, 
 compromising, 
 legitimizing. 
Mixing distinct value categories may take several forms. One common feature of these forms is the act of combining existing value categories to contribute novel variants of value. Compromising concern solving grievances among the interacting parties. From the legitimization point of view, hybrids are attuned to catering to the demands of multiple audiences: the government, citizens and clients, as well as the competitive markets.

The discussion of relational aspects of hybridity among nodes, dyads and networks raises number of questions. Sometimes governing hybridity necessitates a balancing act among parallel and opposing forces. In other instances, hybridity represents an effort to build genuinely new interaction patterns to settle the issues at hand, but it is also the case that hybridity brings out restrictions on interaction patterns.

The hybridity can be studied across levels of society in micro, meso and macro settings. However, aggregation of institutions follow different patterns within government, business and civil society The relational aspect appears  as integration and separation (node), in dyads between e.g professionals and managers and between providers and beneficiaries, and within networks as actors with different attributes

Terminology 
Borys and Jemison introduced the concept of "hybrid organizational arrangements", aligning the concept with strategic alliances, R&D partnerships, joint ventures and licensing. The authors reviewed prior research and provided a qualitative framework for classification of different types of hybrid organizational arrangements consisting of breadth of purpose, boundary determination, value creation and stability mechanisms.

Later, Oliver Williamson introduced the concept of a "hybrid form" in transaction cost economics. A hybrid form can be defined as "a set of organizations such that coordination between those organizations takes place by means of the price mechanism and various other coordination mechanisms simultaneously"

Effects 
As hybrid organizations combine diverse stakeholder groups, the potential for conflict within them might be greater. This is the challenge of stakeholder management.

This problem is similarly emphasized from the perspective of agency theory. The so-called 'multiple principal problem' combines various collective action problems that can occur with hybridity. Free-riding or duplication in steering and monitoring procedures can result in high costs. Similarly, directive ambiguity or lobbying of the corporations by individual stakeholders can induce inefficiency.

Any tensions can have positive and negative economic, performance related, cultural and governance related effects for the organization, its principles, and its customers. For instance, for state-owned enterprises, Schmitz argues that the combination of public and private interests brings an optimal combination of incentives for reducing costs and improving quality in comparison with pure production forms. In contrast, Voorn, Van Genugten, and Van Thiel hypothesize that diversity of ownership may lead to benefits such as specialization and increased efficiency, but also downsides such as increased failure rates.

Examples 
Examples of hybrid forms of organization include:

 Public service organization that were established by societal actors, such as (in the European context) most social housing providers, public schools and hospitals; 
 Public sector organizations that behave in a business-like way, such as state-owned enterprises that also compete on the marketplace; 
 Private sector organizations that include franchising, joint ventures, and business groups; 
 Associations, especially trade associations encompassing non profit, impact oriented  (public relations, lobbying, special interest groups) with profit oriented activities (e.g. events, seminars, consulting) through a subcompany, mostly a fully-owned subsidiary. 
 Microfinance organizations; 
 Islamic banks straddle elements and logics of religion and banking. 
 Hybrid corporations engaging in corporate social entrepreneurship, progressing social and environmental activity in addition to returns for shareholders.
 hybrid co-operatives have members from more than one stakeholder group, for instance both individual consumers and other co-operatives, as does The Co-operative Group.

Intentional? 
Not all hybrid forms are intentional as their value creation may take place 'by default'. Hemingway's ethnographic study of a British-based multi-national corporation, where corporate social responsibility was found to be practised informally by some employees, in addition to their formal job roles, pointed out that unless a corporate employee was given dispensation from the profit motive in order to specifically create social value, even the most hybrid of corporations could not be described as a social enterprise staffed by social entrepreneurs (although employees' activities outside of the workplace might be). However, she did find evidence of corporate social entrepreneurship, where some employees had enlarged their own job roles to encompass social responsibility, in one or more forms.

References

Further reading 
 Albert, S., & Whetten, D. A. (1985). Organizational Identity. Research in Organizational Behavior, 7, 263-295. JAI Press, Inc.
Battilana, Julie & Silvia Dorado. Building sustainable hybrid organizations: The case of commercial microfinance organizations. "Academy of Management Journal, 53:6, 1419–1440.
 Billis, David (2010): Hybrid Organizations and the Third Sector, Palgrave Macmillan
 Bryan Borys and David B. Jemison (1989): Hybrid Arrangements as Strategic Alliances: Theoretical Issues in Organizational Combinations, Academy of Management Review, April 1, 1989 vol. 14 no. 2 234-249
 Ciesielska, Malgorzata (2010) Hybrid Organisations. A study of the Open Source – business setting. Copenhagen Business School Press http://openarchive.cbs.dk/bitstream/handle/10398/8200/Malgorzata_Ciesielska.pdf?sequence=1
 Douma, Sytse & Hein Schreuder (2013): "Economic Approaches to Organizations", 5th edition, London: Pearson
 Gillett, Alex G. and Kevin D. Tennent (2018). "Shadow hybridity and the institutional logic of professional sport: Perpetuating a sporting business in times of rapid social and economic change." Journal of Management History 24.2: 228-259: https://doi.org/10.1108/JMH-11-2017-0060
 Gillett, A., Loader, K., Doherty, B., & Scott, J. M. (2018). An examination of tensions in a hybrid collaboration: A longitudinal study of an empty homes project. Journal of Business Ethics, 1-19: https://doi.org/10.1007/s10551-018-3962-7
 Hatch, Mary Jo & Anne Cunliffe (2006): Organization Theory: Modern, Symbolic, and Postmodern Perspectives, Oxford University Press
 Hemingway, C.A. (2013a): Corporate Social Entrepreneurship. In Idowu, S.O., Capaldi, N., Zu, L. and Das Gupta, A. (eds.), Encyclopedia of Corporate Social Responsibility, Volume 1. Springer-Verlag Berlin Heidelberg, pp. 546–553.
 Hemingway, C.A. (2013b), Corporate Social Entrepreneurship: Integrity Within. Cambridge University Press. .
 Karré, Philip Marcel (2011): Heads and Tails: Both Sides of the Coin. An Analysis of Hybrid Organizations in the Dutch Waste Management Sector, Eleven International Publishing
 Koppell, Jonathan (2003): The Politics of Quasi-Government, Cambridge University Press
 Rainey, Hal G. (1996): Understanding and Managing Public Organizations, 2nd ed., Jossey-Bass
 Williamson, Oliver E. (1991): "Comparative Economic Organization: The Analysis of Discrete Structural Alternatives", Administrative Science Quarterly, vol. 36, no 2.

External links
 Hybrid organization definition 
 Jonathan G S Koppell,  The Politics of Quasi-Government: Hybrid Organizations and the Dynamics of Bureaucratic Contro, Cambridge University Press, 2003

Organizational studies
Types of organization